The 2005 National Football League, known for sponsorship reasons as the Allianz National Football League, was the 74th staging of the National Football League (NFL), an annual Gaelic football tournament for the Gaelic Athletic Association county teams of Ireland.

Armagh beat Wexford in the final to win their first title after losing three previous finals.

Division 2 was won by Monaghan who beat Meath in the final.

Format 
The top 16 teams are drawn into Divisions 1A and 1B. The other 16 teams are drawn into Divisions 2A and 2B. Each team plays all the other teams in its section once: either home or away. Teams earn 2 points for a win and 1 for a draw.

The top two teams in Divisions 2A and 2B progress to the Division 2 semi-finals and are promoted. The bottom two teams in Divisions 1A and 1B are relegated. The top two teams in Divisions 1A and 1B progress to the NFL semi-finals.

Results

Division 1

Division 1A Table

Division 1B Table

Final

Division 2

Division 2A Table

Division 2B Table

Final

References

National Football League
National Football League (Ireland) seasons